North Drove railway station was a station serving Pode Hole in Lincolnshire, England.  It was on the route of the Spalding and Bourne Railway (opened 1866), later part of the Midland and Great Northern Joint Railway.

History

The station and line opened on 1 August 1866, closed temporarily between 9 October 1880 and 1 February 1881, and closed permanently on 15 September 1958, although the line remained open for goods until 1964.

References

External links
 North Drove station on navigable 1946 O. S. map

Disused railway stations in Lincolnshire
Former Midland and Great Northern Joint Railway stations
Railway stations in Great Britain opened in 1866
Railway stations in Great Britain closed in 1880
Railway stations in Great Britain opened in 1881
Railway stations in Great Britain closed in 1958
1866 establishments in England